Coulsdon East was a ward in the London Borough of Croydon, covering part of the Coulsdon area of London in the United Kingdom. The ward formed part of Chris Philp MP's Croydon South constituency.
At the 2011 Census the population of the Ward was 12,244.

The ward returned three councillors every four years to Croydon Council. At the 2006 Croydon Council election, Terry Lenton, Brian Udell and Chris Wright were elected to the council. All stood as Conservative Party candidates. In Coulsdon East in 2006, the Labour Party did not field any candidates. The local election marked the highest turnout (57.2%) in the London Borough elections in 2006.

At the 2010 local elections the ward was retained by the Conservatives. The 2010 election coincided with the General election which had the effect of improving turnout amongst voters. Turnout climbed to 73.5%.

The successful Conservative candidates were Justin Cromie, Terry Lenton and Chris Wright. The Conservative share of the vote fell from 63.2% to 48.6% with the Liberal Democrats' share of the vote falling to 26.9%. The Labour party polled 9.9%, their lowest share in Borough of Croydon wards in the 2010 election.

List of Councillors

Ward Result

References

External links
Conservative Councillors for Croydon.
London Borough of Croydon map of wards.

Former wards of the London Borough of Croydon
2018 disestablishments in England